Esteban Aguilera (2 September 1941 – 5 May 2001) was a Cuban boxer. He competed in the men's lightweight event at the 1960 Summer Olympics.

References

1941 births
2001 deaths
Cuban male boxers
Olympic boxers of Cuba
Boxers at the 1960 Summer Olympics
People from Manzanillo, Cuba
Lightweight boxers